George Arthur Hardy Bullock-Douglas (4 June 1911 – 25 June 1958) was a New Zealand rugby union player. A wing three-quarter, Bullock-Douglas represented Wanganui at a provincial level, and was a member of the New Zealand national side, the All Blacks, from 1932 to 1934. He played 15 matches for the All Blacks including five internationals.

Bullock-Douglas was educated first at Gonville School. He then had a stint at Auckland Grammar School and lastly, Wanganui Collegiate School where he was a member of the 1st XV in his two years at the school between 1927 and 1928. He was also a member of the school's 1st XI cricket team. He later played representative cricket for Wanganui, and appeared in a match for Wanganui against the MCC on their 1935–36 tour of New Zealand. In that match, Bullock-Douglas batted at number 7 or 8, and scored 14 and 0 respectively in his two innings.

A bank officer, Bullock-Douglas was awarded a Diploma in Banking by Victoria University College in 1934. During World War II he served as an officer with the 21st Battalion of the New Zealand Military Forces, reaching the rank of captain. He saw active service in Greece and North Africa, and was twice wounded: in Greece in 1941, and Libya in 1943.

References

1911 births
1958 deaths
Rugby union players from Whanganui
People educated at Auckland Grammar School
People educated at Whanganui Collegiate School
Victoria University of Wellington alumni
New Zealand rugby union players
New Zealand international rugby union players
Wanganui rugby union players
Rugby union wings
New Zealand cricketers
New Zealand military personnel of World War II